Lloyd Lewis  may refer to:

Lloyd A. Lewis, theologian at the Virginia Theological Seminary
Lloyd E. Lewis, Jr., former member of the Ohio House of Representatives

See also
Lewis Lloyd (born 1959), retired American basketball player
Lewis Vivian Loyd (1852–1908), British Conservative Party politician